USS Dapdap (YFB-684) was a United States Navy working launch in service from 1908 to 1942.

History
Dapdap (YFB-684), a working launch, was attached to the United States Asiatic Fleet at Naval Station, Cavite, Philippine Islands, or the 16th Naval District from 1908 to 1942.

Dapdap was lost, 2 January 1942, to Japanese forces during the conquest of Luzon Island.  She earned one battle star.

She was stricken from the Navy List on 24 July 1942.

References

 
 

World War II auxiliary ships of the United States
1908 ships